Cocoa Expos was an American soccer team, founded in 1993. The team was a member of the United Soccer Leagues Premier Development League (PDL), the fourth tier of the American Soccer Pyramid, until 2007, when the team left the league and the franchise was terminated.

The team played its home matches at the Cocoa Municipal Stadium the city of Cocoa, Florida, approximately 45 miles from Orlando. The team's colors were blue and white.

The team also had a sister organization, the Cocoa Expos Women, which played in the women's USL W-League, but which also folded at the end of 2007.

Year-by-year

Honors
 USL PDL Southeast Division Champions 2005
 USL PDL Southeast Division Champions 2003
 USL PDL Southeast Division Champions 2001
 USISL PDL National Championship Runner-up 1997
 USISL PDL Southeast Division Champions 1997
 USISL Premier League Eastern/Southern Division Champions 1996
 USISL Premier League Eastern Division Champions 1995
 USISL Premier League Southeast Division Champions 1994

Competition history
After joining the league in 1994 the Expos became one of the most successful and popular teams in the USL Premier Development League. In their first three seasons, from 1994 to 1997, the team lost only three regular season games, and played in the Conference Championship game four times, in 1995, 1997, 2001, and 2004. During their 2001 preseason the Expos played former the Major League Soccer franchise Tampa Bay Mutiny and lost only 1–0. In the year 2005 the Expos qualified for the Lamar Hunt U.S. Open Cup for the third time. However, their final season in 2007 proved to be disastrous, the team losing 13 of 15 matches and scoring just one goal all season.

Coaches
  Chris Ramsey 1991–1992
  Alan Dicks 1994
  Gerry Queen 2001–2006
  Udo Schenatzky 2007

Stadia
 Cocoa Municipal Stadium, Cocoa, Florida 2003–07

Average attendance
 2007: 197
 2006: 197
 2005: 209

References
Specific

External links
Cocoa Expos

Defunct soccer clubs in Florida
Sports in Brevard County, Florida
Defunct indoor soccer clubs in the United States
Defunct Premier Development League teams
USISL teams
1993 establishments in Florida
2007 disestablishments in Florida
Association football clubs established in 1993
Association football clubs disestablished in 2007